Berenguer Estanyol d'Empúries was the vicar general of the Duchy of Athens for four years from 1312 to 1316. He was sent there by Frederick II of Sicily to rule on behalf of his five-year-old son Manfred, who was installed as per the request of the Catalan Company. 

Berenguer arrived in Piraeus in 1312 with five Sicilian galleys to relieve Roger Deslaur of the government. Berenguer was an able governor who strengthened the Catalan hold on Attica and Boeotia. He had to fight the Venetians of Negroponte, the Byzantine Greeks of Thessaly (especially the Doukai of Neopatria), the Franks of the Argolid, where the Brienne cadet branch of Foucherolles was empowered. He was successful in his endeavours before he sank into a severe illness which lasted long before he finally succumbed in 1316. He was succeeded as vicar general by Alfonso Fadrique.

Sources
 
  

1316 deaths
Year of birth unknown
Vicars-General of the Duchy of Athens